was a village located in Miyoshi District, Tokushima Prefecture, Japan.

As of 2003, the village had an estimated population of 2,114 and a density of 9.25 persons per km². The total area was 228.62 km².

On March 1, 2006, Higashiiyayama, along with the towns of Ikawa, Ikeda, Mino and Yamashiro, and the village of Nishiiyayama (all from Miyoshi District), was merged to create the city of Miyoshi.

Geography
Situated near the border with Kōchi Prefecture, it has much precipitation, mostly due to the East Asian rainy season. In the winter, there is much snowfall in this mountainous town. Mount Tsurugi, the second highest mountain in Shikoku at 1955 metres is located here.

Mountains: Mount Tsurugi, Miune
Rivers: Iya River

Surrounding municipalities
Tokushima Prefecture
Mima
Tsurugi
Mikamo
Nishiiyayama
Naka
Kōchi Prefecture
Ōtoyo
Monobe

External links

 

Dissolved municipalities of Tokushima Prefecture
Miyoshi, Tokushima